Bruno Fischer (29 June 1908 – 16 March 1992) was a German-born American author of weird and crime fiction.

Biography 
The son of a grocer, Fischer was born in Berlin, Germany, on 29 June 1908.  Bruno emigrated to the United States with his family in 1913, attending high school in Long Island.  He later attended the Rand School of Social Science and married Ruth Miller, a secretary, in 1934. Fischer became a sports reporter and then police reporter for the Long Island Daily Press (1929–31), following this with stints writing and editing at the Labor Voice (1931–32), Socialist Call (1934–36), and Modern Monthly.  In the 1936 election he ran as a candidate for New York's 14th district, and in 1938 he ran for the New York State Senate (12th district, Manhattan), both times under the Socialist banner.

With journalism providing an unreliable income, at a friend's recommendation Fischer tried his hand at writing for the pulps. Among the hundreds of pulp titles available at that time, Fischer was taken by the horror/terror titles, the so-called "shudder pulps:" Dime Mystery, Terror Tales, Sinister Stories, and others.  He sold his first story immediately, a horror tale ("The Cat Woman", Dime Mystery, November 1936).  While he often wrote under his own name, this first story and others came out under the pseudonym “Russell Gray”, a name he had used during his newspaper days when writing two pieces for the same edition.  Other pulp stories appeared under the pen name Harrison Storm, but he no longer used this pseudonym after 1943. Initially Fischer became known as a purveyor of stories within the "weird menace" and "defective detective" subgenres, the latter being detectives with distinctive physical flaws. However, as Fischer recalled, these markets ended quite suddenly:In 1940 I was living in Florida with my family when the whole terror-horror market collapsed....  I got a letter saying the magazines had folded, and all my unpublished stories were returned. They just stopped, just like that. It was a shock. Just one day the market was gone.With his original markets gone, he moved to more general detective and crime fiction, with stories appearing in Dime Detective, Black Mask, and others. Ultimately he published several hundred stories, claiming to have written some two million words of fiction from 1937 to 1941 alone.

Fischer published his first novel, So Much Blood, in 1939. As the pulps died off in the late 40s and early 50s, novels became his primary output, though several of his short stories still appeared in the digest magazines (like Manhunt and Mike Shayne Mystery Magazine) that were the pulps' successor. Several of his books were published by Dell and Lion Books, including the popular Ben Helm series of P. I. novels. Paperback-original publishing house Gold Medal Books took on Fischer on the recommendation of John D. MacDonald. Gold Medal released several of his novels in the 1950s; House of Flesh (Gold Medal #123, 1950) sold some 1.8 million copies. An early member of the Mystery Writers of America, he was the editor of one of their annual short story collections, 1953's Crooks' Tour, and he is known to have written at least one erotic novel in 1970 (Domination, Olympia/Ophelia Press) under the pen name "Jason K. Storm".

In the 1960s Fischer worked as executive editor for Collier Books and education editor at the Arco Publishing Company. His last novel was 1973's The Evil Days, written after the demands of his job and a lengthy writer's block had greatly reduced his output. Following this he spent his later years between a summer home in a socialist cooperative community in New York’s Putnam County (the Three Arrows Cooperative Society) and the Mexican town of San Miguel de Allende, where he sometimes gave lectures to the expatriate retirees about his adventures as a mystery writer. Nearly blind towards the end of his life, he died of a stroke while on a Mexican vacation with his wife on 16 March 1992.

Noted critic Anthony Boucher once wrote that Fischer displayed "a warm understanding of human relationships". Fischer himself described his "usual manner" of writing as containing "movement and suspense with very little violence" and as being about "ordinary people in extraordinary situations". His novels sold some 10 million copies and his works were translated into 12 languages, but by the time of his death he had largely faded into obscurity like many crime writers of his era. Modern releases of his books have been made by Stark House Press, while two volumes of his short story work as Russell Gray have been released by Ramble House.

Bibliography

General novels 

 So Much Blood (1939; aka Stairway to Death)
 The Hornet's Nest (1944)
 Quoth the Raven (1944; aka Croaked the Raven; The Fingered Man)
 Kill to Fit (1946)
 The Pigskin Bag (1946)
 The Spider Lily (1946)
 The Bleeding Scissors (1948; aka The Scarlet Scissors)
 The Lustful Ape (1950; with Lion Books as Russell Gray; re-released that same year by Gold Medal as Bruno Fischer)
 House of Flesh (1950)
 Fools Walk In (1951)
 The Lady Kills (1951)
 The Fast Buck (1952)
 Run for Your Life (1953)
 So Wicked My Love (1954; a shorter version appeared in Manhunt, November 1953, as “Coney Island Incident”)
 Knee-Deep in Death (1956)
 Murder in the Raw (1957)
 Second-Hand Nude (1959)
 The Girl Between (1960)
 The Evil Days (1973)

The Ben Helm series 
 The Dead Men Grin (1945)
 More Deaths Than One (1947)
 The Restless Hands (1949; a shorter version first appeared in Mystery Book Magazine, Summer 1949)
 The Angels Fell (1950; aka The Flesh Was Cold)
 The Silent Dust (1950)
 The Paper Circle (1951; aka Stripped for Murder)
 “Dead Men Grin, The” (Two Complete Detective Books, Sep 1946)
 "The Quiet Woman" (Dell Mystery Novels Magazine, Jan/Mar 1955; re-released in the Oct. 1962 issue of Mike Shayne's Mystery Magazine as “Death Attends Rehearsal”)

References 

1908 births
1992 deaths
German emigrants to the United States
American crime fiction writers